Edward Thomas Mervyn Garlick (26 September 1883 – 23 September 1935) was an Australian rules footballer who played with Melbourne in the Victorian Football League (VFL). In 1904 he was cleared to South Bendigo in the Bendigo Football League.

Notes

External links 

 

1883 births
1935 deaths
Australian rules footballers from Victoria (Australia)
Melbourne Football Club players
People educated at Melbourne Grammar School
South Bendigo Football Club players